Rudolf Leip (8 June 1890 – 5 March 1947) was a German international footballer.

References

1890 births
1947 deaths
Association football forwards
German footballers
Germany international footballers